Rose Elizabeth Dunn (September 5, 1878 – June 11, 1955) also known as Rose of Cimarron and later Rose of the Cimarron, was best known for her good looks and for her romantic involvement with outlaw George "Bittercreek" Newcomb when she was a teenager during the closing years of the Old West.

Early life
Rose Dunn was born near what is today Ingalls, Oklahoma (when she was born it was in Indian Territory, Oklahoma Territory was not organized until 1890). Her family was poor, but she received a formal education at a convent in Wichita, Kansas. Dunn's two older brothers became minor outlaws by the time she was 12. She learned to ride, rope and shoot from her brothers. Through them, she met and became involved romantically with George Newcomb circa 1893, when she was either 14 or 15 years of age.

George "Bittercreek" Newcomb
Dunn met and became involved romantically with George "Bittercreek" Newcomb around 1893. The gang that Newcomb ran with worshipped her due to her good looks and her calm and kind demeanor, and were fiercely defensive of her, spawning her loyalty to them.

She was completely infatuated with Newcomb and began supporting Newcomb's outlaw life by venturing into town for supplies, as he was a wanted man and could not. Newcomb by that time was riding with the Wild Bunch gang led by outlaw Bill Doolin. By this time her brothers had left the outlaw life and had become bounty hunters, calling themselves the Dunn Brothers.

On September 1, 1893, the gang was cornered in Ingalls by a posse of US marshals, in what became known as the Battle of Ingalls, resulting in an intense shootout. A western legend has it that Newcomb was badly wounded, and while he lay in the street, Dunn is alleged to have run from the "Pierce Hotel" to him with two belts of ammunition and a Winchester rifle. She fired the rifle at the marshals while Newcomb reloaded his revolvers, and Newcomb was able to escape. However, that account has never been verified, and was never mentioned by the US Marshal official report, which indicated that Newcomb at best fired two shots then fled.

Three deputy marshals were killed during the shootout. Newcomb and Charley Pierce were wounded, but escaped. Gang member "Arkansas Tom" Jones was slightly wounded and captured by Deputy Marshal Jim Masterson. Together with Newcomb and other members of the gang, Dunn hid out for at least two months nursing the remaining gang members back to health.

By 1895, Newcomb had a $5,000 bounty placed on him, dead or alive. Newcomb and Pierce hid out near Norman, Oklahoma, both of them having been wounded in a gun battle with US marshals. On May 2, 1895, the Dunn Brothers shot and killed both Newcomb and Pierce as they dismounted in front of the Dunn house to visit Rose. The brothers collected the bounty, believed to have been $5,000 each.

Later life
After the killing of "Bittercreek" Newcomb, Dunn was often accused of having set him up, revealing to her brothers where the outlaws were hiding. She denied this, and her brothers later defended her, stating that she had no knowledge of their intentions, nor did she reveal the hideout to them. She was never prosecuted for her involvement with the gang. Her short outlaw life launched her to the level of western legend. In 1898 she married local politician Charles Albert Noble, and sometime after 1900 (a census year), they left Oklahoma and all outlaw associations behind them. Charles Noble died in 1930 and she married Richard Fleming (whom she first met when 16) in 1946.

She died at the age of 76 in Salkum, Washington.

In pop culture 
The name "Rose of Cimarron" (not that of Rose Dunn) first came to popular attention with the publication of Bill Tilghman's booklet, Oklahoma Outlaws.

References

External links
Find a Grave
Rose of the Cimarron partial bio

Outlaws of the American Old West
People of Indian Territory
Gunslingers of the American Old West
1878 births
1955 deaths